Makaryevsky Uyezd (Макарьевский уезд) was one of the subdivisions of the Kostroma Governorate of the Russian Empire. It was situated in the southern part of the governorate. Its administrative centre was Makaryev.

Demographics
At the time of the Russian Empire Census of 1897, Makaryevsky Uyezd had a population of 144,571. Of these, 99.9% spoke Russian as their native language.

References

 
Uezds of Kostroma Governorate
Kostroma Governorate